In mathematics, finitely generated may refer to:
 Finitely generated object
 Finitely generated group
 Finitely generated monoid
 Finitely generated abelian group
 Finitely generated module
 Finitely generated ideal
 Finitely generated algebra
 Finitely generated space

de:Endlich erzeugt